Evergestis dusmeti is a species of moth in the family Crambidae. It is found in Spain and North Africa, including Morocco.

References

Moths described in 1955
Evergestis
Moths of Europe
Moths of Africa